Kendra Suzanne Horn (born June 9, 1976) is an American lawyer and politician who served as the U.S. representative for Oklahoma's 5th congressional district from 2019 to 2021. A member of the Democratic Party, her district included almost all of Oklahoma City.

Horn defeated Republican incumbent Steve Russell in the 2018 election, in what many political analysts considered an upset victory. She was the first Democrat to represent the state's 5th congressional district in 44 years and the first Oklahoma Democrat elected to Congress in eight years. She was the first Democratic woman elected to the House from Oklahoma. Horn lost her 2020 re-election bid to Republican challenger Stephanie Bice, after serving one term.

She was the Democratic nominee in the Oklahoma Senate special election in 2022.

Early life and education 
Born in Chickasha, Oklahoma, Horn was a member of the Girl Scouts and received the Gold Award. Horn received her bachelor's degree in political science with Omicron Delta Kappa honors from the University of Tulsa in 1998. In 2001, Horn received her J.D. degree from Southern Methodist University Dedman School of Law. She also studied at the International Space University in Strasbourg, France.

Early career 
Kendra Horn worked in private practice as a lawyer at a small firm in Dallas, Texas before opening a solo practice in 2002. Horn served as the press secretary to United States Congressman Brad Carson (OK-02) from 2004 to 2005. She went on to work for the Space Foundation first as Manager of Government Affairs at their D.C. office and later as the Manager of Communication and Media Relations until 2008. She also worked as a strategic consultant with Amatra, a communication technology firm, beginning in 2009. During the  2014 Oklahoma gubernatorial election, Horn managed the political campaign of Democratic nominee Joe Dorman. In addition, Horn co-founded and served as executive director of Sally's List, an Oklahoma-based organization that recruits and supports women candidates, and Women Lead Oklahoma, a nonpartisan nonprofit that trains and supports women to encourage community and civic action.

U.S. House of Representatives

Elections

2018 

On July 3, 2017, Horn announced her candidacy for the Democratic nomination for United States House of Representatives to Oklahoma's fifth congressional district. After receiving 44% of the vote in the Democratic primary on June 26, 2018, Horn and primary opponent Tom Guild advanced to the primary runoff. During the August 28 primary, Horn received 76% of the vote, easily defeating Tom Guild and becoming the Democratic nominee.

Horn defeated Republican Steve Russell in the November 6 general election with 50.7% to his 49.3% of the vote, in what was widely considered one of the biggest upset victories of the cycle. Nearly every major rating organization believed Russell would win, and FiveThirtyEight only gave Horn a 14% percent chance of winning. Ultimately, Horn won by defeating Russell in Oklahoma County, home to three-fourths of the district's population, by 9,900 votes, more than three times the overall margin of 3,300 votes. She garnered support from female Republican voters in an election largely seen as a referendum against President Donald Trump.

When Horn took office, she became the first Democrat to represent the district since John Jarman in 1974, who switched parties to become a Republican midway through what would be his final term.

2020 

Horn won the Democratic nomination for her seat in the 2020 primary. She faced Republican Oklahoma State Senator Stephanie Bice in the 2020 general election. Bice defeated Horn in the 2020 election, returning the seat to Republican control.

After the 2020 election, Horn joined former Congress members Xochitl Torres Small and Joe Cunningham to launch Shield PAC, a political action committee that hopes to raise funds to defend moderate Democrats in swing districts.

Tenure 

On January 3, 2019, the first day of the 116th United States Congress, Congresswoman Horn joined 219 other Democrats to support Nancy Pelosi in the chamber-wide election for Speaker of the United States House of Representatives. When explaining her decision to support Pelosi, Horn mentioned that the Democratic and Republican nominees were Pelosi and Kevin McCarthy, respectively, and said that Pelosi's support for improving health care, strengthening Medicare and Social Security, and supporting public education aligned with her successful campaign platform in the 2018 election and therefore with her goals in Congress. The admission of Horn to the New Democrat Coalition was announced on January 23. On January 29, Horn announced she was joining the Blue Dog Coalition, a group of moderate and conservative Democrats. Horn is considered to be a moderate Democrat.

On December 18, 2019, Horn voted for both articles of impeachment against President Trump.

Committee assignments 

 Committee on Armed Services
 Subcommittee on Readiness
 Subcommittee on Strategic Forces
 Committee on Science, Space, and Technology
 Subcommittee on Energy
 Subcommittee on Space and Aeronautics (Chair)

Caucus memberships 

 Blue Dog Coalition
 New Democrat Coalition
Problem Solvers Caucus

2022 U.S. Senate campaign

In March 2022, Horn announced that she would be running in the 2022 United States Senate special election in Oklahoma after Jim Inhofe announced his retirement. Horn ran unopposed for the Democratic nomination. She lost the general election to Republican candidate Markwayne Mullin.

Personal life 
Horn was born and raised in Chickasha, Oklahoma. She is an Episcopalian.

Electoral history

See also 
 Women in the United States House of Representatives

References

External links 

Kendra Horn for US Senate campaign website
 
 

|-

|-

1976 births
21st-century American politicians
21st-century American women politicians
American lawyers
Candidates in the 2022 United States Senate elections
Democratic Party members of the United States House of Representatives from Oklahoma
Dedman School of Law alumni
Female members of the United States House of Representatives
Living people
People from Chickasha, Oklahoma
Politicians from Oklahoma City
University of Tulsa alumni
Women in Oklahoma politics